Sir John Walton David Gray  (1 October 1936 – 1 September 2003) was a senior British diplomat.

In 1987, as the British ambassador to Beirut, Gray unsuccessfully attempted to dissuade Terry Waite from re-entering Beirut without proper protection, with the result that Waite was kidnapped and held for nearly five years.

Early life
John Gray was born in at Burry Port in Carmarthenshire and educated at Blundell's School. After National Service in Cyprus and Egypt he attended Christ's College, Cambridge and later did postgraduate research in Arab nationalism at the Middle East Centre in Oxford and the American University in Cairo. He joined the diplomatic service in 1962 and retained his link with the Middle East throughout his career.

Diplomatic career
1964 – Bahrain
1967 – Foreign and Commonwealth Office, London
1970 – Geneva
1974 – Sofia
1977 (approx) Jedda
1982 - Foreign and Commonwealth Office, London (Head of Maritime, Aviation and Environment Department)
1985 – Beirut (Ambassador)
1988 – Paris (Ambassador and UK Permanent Representative to the Organisation for Economic Co-operation and Development)
1992–1996 Belgium (Ambassador)

Later career
Gray retired from the Foreign Office in 1996 and on returning to Wales became involved in public and community affairs, including:
A member of the Cardiff Bay Development Corporation
A trustee of the National Botanic Garden of Wales.
 Appointment as Honorary Consul of Belgium in Cardiff.
Vice-president of Crawshays Welsh Rugby Football Club
Participation in the work of the Institute of Welsh Affairs
Chairman,  Welsh Centre for International Affairs at Cardiff's Temple of Peace.
Governor, University of Glamorgan
Toastmasters International, After Dinner Speaker of the Year - 1993

Sources
"Obituary - Sir John Gray, The Times, 2 October 2003"
"Obituary - Sir John Gray, The Independent, 8 September 2003"

1936 births
2003 deaths
Ambassadors of the United Kingdom to Lebanon
Ambassadors of the United Kingdom to France
Ambassadors of the United Kingdom to Belgium
Knights Commander of the Order of the British Empire
Companions of the Order of St Michael and St George
People educated at Blundell's School
People from Burry Port
Permanent Representatives of the United Kingdom to the OECD